Michael Riley Galitzen, also known as Mickey Riley (September 6, 1909, Los Angeles, California – June 6, 1959, Hollywood, California) was an American diver who won four total medals, one gold, at the 1928 Summer Olympics and 1932 Summer Olympics.

Galitzen won acclaim both for his individual diving and as a tandem diver with his brother John.  He won two medals in diving at Amsterdam in 1928 as Michael Galitzen.  In 1931 his coach suggested that the brothers use Americanized stage names — "Mickey Riley" and "Johnny Riley". He won gold and silver medals in Los Angeles in 1932 under that name.  After the Olympics, he worked as a film editor, and he and John appeared frequently in diving shows.  He was found dead in his Hollywood apartment in 1959; the death was attributed to natural causes.

Galitzen was inducted into the International Swimming Hall of Fame in 1977.

References

External links
 International Swimming Hall of Fame profile
 Hickoksports.com profile
 New York Times obituary, June 11, 1959 (subscription required)

1909 births
1959 deaths
Sportspeople from Los Angeles
Divers at the 1928 Summer Olympics
Divers at the 1932 Summer Olympics
Olympic gold medalists for the United States in diving
Olympic silver medalists for the United States in diving
Olympic bronze medalists for the United States in diving
American male divers
Medalists at the 1932 Summer Olympics
Medalists at the 1928 Summer Olympics